Oreovica may refer to:

 Oreovica (Žabari), a village in Serbia
 Oreovica (Pirot), a village in Serbia